In differential geometry, normal coordinates at a point p in a differentiable manifold equipped with a symmetric affine connection are a local coordinate system in a neighborhood of p obtained by applying the exponential map to the tangent space at p.  In a normal coordinate system, the Christoffel symbols of the connection vanish at the point p, thus often simplifying local calculations.  In normal coordinates associated to the Levi-Civita connection of a Riemannian manifold, one can additionally arrange that the metric tensor is the Kronecker delta at the point p, and that the first partial derivatives of the metric at p vanish.

A basic result of differential geometry states that normal coordinates at a point always exist on a manifold with a symmetric affine connection.  In such coordinates the covariant derivative reduces to a partial derivative (at p only), and the geodesics through p are locally linear functions of t (the affine parameter). This idea was implemented in a fundamental way by Albert Einstein in the general theory of relativity: the  equivalence principle uses normal coordinates via inertial frames.  Normal coordinates always exist for the Levi-Civita connection of a Riemannian or Pseudo-Riemannian manifold. By contrast, in general there is no way to define normal coordinates for Finsler manifolds in a way that the exponential map are twice-differentiable .

Geodesic normal coordinates
Geodesic normal coordinates are local coordinates on a manifold with an affine connection defined by means of the exponential map

 

and an isomorphism

 

given by any basis of the tangent space at the fixed basepoint .  If the additional structure of a Riemannian metric is imposed, then the basis defined by E may be required in addition to be orthonormal, and the resulting coordinate system is then known as a Riemannian normal coordinate system.

Normal coordinates exist on a normal neighborhood of a point p in M. A normal neighborhood U is an open subset of M such that there is a proper neighborhood V of the origin in the tangent space TpM, and expp acts as a diffeomorphism between U and V. On a normal neighborhood U of p in M, the chart is given by:

 

The isomorphism E, and therefore the chart, is in no way unique.
A convex normal neighborhood U is a normal neighborhood of every p in U. The existence of these sort of open neighborhoods (they form a topological base)   has been established by J.H.C. Whitehead for symmetric affine connections.

Properties 

The properties of normal coordinates often simplify computations.

Thus radial paths in normal coordinates are exactly the geodesics through .
 The coordinates of the point  are 

Explicit formulae 

 become

 

The corresponding Levi-Civita connection Christoffel symbols are

 

Similarly we can construct local coframes in which

 

and the spin-connection coefficients take the values

Polar coordinates
On a Riemannian manifold, a normal coordinate system at p facilitates the introduction of a system of spherical coordinates, known as polar coordinates.  These are the coordinates on M obtained by introducing the standard spherical coordinate system on the Euclidean space TpM.  That is, one introduces on TpM the standard spherical coordinate system (r,φ) where r ≥ 0 is the radial parameter and φ = (φ1,...,φn−1) is a parameterization of the (n−1)-sphere.  Composition of (r,φ) with the inverse of the exponential map at p is a polar coordinate system.

Polar coordinates provide a number of fundamental tools in Riemannian geometry.  The radial coordinate is the most significant: geometrically it represents the geodesic distance to p of nearby points.  Gauss's lemma asserts that the gradient of r is simply the partial derivative .  That is,

for any smooth function ƒ.  As a result, the metric in polar coordinates assumes a block diagonal form

References
 .
 .
 Chern, S. S.; Chen, W. H.; Lam, K. S.; Lectures on Differential Geometry, World Scientific, 2000

See also
Gauss Lemma
Fermi coordinates
Local reference frame
Synge's world function

Riemannian geometry
Coordinate systems in differential geometry